Gran Risa is a World Cup giant slalom ski course in Italy at Alta Badia. On Piz La Ila mountain in the Dolomites, it hosted its first World Cup event in 1985.

This slope is considered one of the top three GS courses on the circuit, along with Kranjska Gora (SLO) and Adelboden (SUI).

Course
The men's World Cup giant slalom was held on the Gran Risa for the first time in 1985, and every year since 1990 (usually in mid-December). From 2006 to 2011, World Cup slaloms also took place on the Gran Risa. 
 
Since 2015, the Gran Risa has also been the venue for World Cup parallel giant slaloms. Women's giant slaloms have only been held twice so far, in 1994 and 2003. The record winner is Marcel Hirscher with six giant slalom victories, with additional wins in slalom and parallel giant slalom.

Sections
 Pump Station, Col Frata, La sTreta, La Curva Calait, Plans

World Cup
This course hosted a total of 49 men's World Cup events (11th of all-time) and total 2 for ladies (108th of all-time).

It has a maximum incline of 34.6 degrees (69%) and the average gradient is 19.8 degrees (36%).

Men

Women

Club5+ 
In 1986, elite Club5 was originally founded by prestigious classic downhill organizers: Kitzbühel, Wengen, Garmisch, Val d’Isère and Val Gardena/Gröden, with goal to bring alpine ski sport on the highest levels possible.

Later over the years other classic long-term organizers joined the now named Club5+: Alta Badia, Cortina, Kranjska Gora, Maribor, Lake Louise, Schladming, Adelboden, Kvitfjell, St.Moritz and Åre.

References

External links
 Ski resort of Alta Badia AltaBadia.it 
 Ski Map of Alta Badia DolomitiSuperski.com 
 FIS Ski World Cup AltaBadia.org 

Skiing in Italy